Incubate was an annual multidisciplinary arts festival held every September in Tilburg, Netherlands from 2005 to 2016. It was originally named ZXZW, but changed its name in 2009 to "Incubate" after a request from the Austin, US-based festival SXSW.

The festival exhibited indie culture events including music, contemporary dance, film and visual arts. It hosted more than 200 artists to an international audience, with performances of black metal, free jazz, street art and academic dance taking place alongside one another.

The organisation also hosted regular showcases of bands under the name Incubated.

History
In 2005 ZXZW started as a two-day underground punk, hardcore and electronic music festival with 47 artists. Within three years it developed into a festival held over eight days with over 200 artists.  The festival broadened its program by adopting a wide range of musical styles (from jazz to free folk and dance), along with film, lectures and visual arts. It was held in small clubs, pubs and galleries around Tilburg. In 2008 the people of Tilburg voted for ZXZW as the best event in their town.

Incubate had an independent culture blog, a blog on non-Western dance music, hosts several art-nights throughout the year and released the Social Festival Model, a platform where attendees could read and alter the business, marketing and policy plans.

By 2015 the festival had financial problems, and a grant was provided by the Province of North Brabant and the Municipality of Tilburg. Three editions of Incubate were held in 2016, but in February 2017 the festival's organizing foundation announced that the grants from Tilburg and North Brabant were withdrawn, and no festival was held in 2017.

Editions and performances (selection)
Incubate was a two-day music event with a pre-party in 2005, and by 2009 became a multidisciplinary art festival lasting more than a week.

ZXZW 2005
The first edition of the ZXZW festival, between September 24 and September 25, featured 48 acts on 7 locations. It was started by Ries Doms, Vincent Koreman, Alex van Wijk and Frank Kimenai.

ZXZW 2006
The second festival was between September 23 and September 24 and featured 94 acts on 11 locations.

ZXZW 2007
The third ZXZW festival took place on September 16 and September 23. The number of bands that played in the music program at the festival increased to 151. There were also other art forms displayed this time: Visual arts, Dance and cinema were added to the line-up. ZXZW 2007 took place at 27 locations, one of those was a squat where young musicians played compositions by young composers. This concept was called ‘Kraaklink’ and has been continued as series the next years.

ZXZW 2008
The fourth edition of ZXZW was hosted between September 14 and September 21, 2008. Most notable were the performances of the Sun Ra Arkestra. They performed six times in seven days at the festival, emphasizing different aspects of the musical legacy of Sun Ra every day. New this year was the special program ‘Norwegian Invasion’ in which several Norwegian artists took a central place.
Also there was a multidisciplinary program (‘Svart Kunststykke’) aimed at the black metal genre in both music (Watain, Glorior Belli) and the visual arts (Erik Smith, Peter Beste). The Shape of Breakcore 2 Cum was a program for electronic dance music and also the Eurovision Noise Contest was held.

Incubate 2009 
The first edition of the festival with the new name Incubate was from September 13 until September 20, 2009. The  acts were confirmed daily on the Incubate website.

Incubate 2010 
The sixth edition of Incubate festival took place from September 12 until September 19, 2010. The theme for this edition was Piracy. Around this theme several events were held, such as The Kiosk of Piracy, Pirate Cinema and the Pirate Conference.

Incubate 2011 
The 2011  edition of Incubate festival took place from September 12 until September 18, 2011.

Incubate 2012 
The eighth edition of Incubate took place from Monday, September 10 to Sunday September 16. The festival attracted more than 15,000 visitors from all over the world.

Incubate 2013 
The ninth edition of Incubate took place from Sunday, September 15 to Sunday, September 22. The festival attracted more than 17,000 visitors from all over the world. More than 300 artists performed in or in the area around Tilburg.

Incubate 2014 
The tenth edition of Incubate took place from Monday, September 15 to Sunday, September 21. 290 artists performed in Tilburg.  The festival attracted more than 17,000 visitors from all over the world.

Incubate 2015 
The eleventh edition of Incubate was held from Monday, September 14 to Sunday, September 20 in Tilburg.

Venues
Incubate took place in the inner city of Tilburg at the following venues:

Bibliotheek Tilburg Centrum, BKKC, Boerderij 't Schop, Café De Plaats, Cul de Sac, De Beukentuin, De NWE Vorst, Dolfijn Bowling, Duvelhok, Extase, Factorium, Filmfoyer, Galerie Kokon, Hall of Fame, Kafee 't Buitenbeentje, Koepelhal, Koningsplein, Kraakpand / Squat, Kunstpodium T, Little Devil, Mayor's Room, Muzentuin, NS16, Open Air Stage, Paradox, Pauluskerk, Pieter Vreedeplein, Project Space Tilburg - Gust van Dijk, 013, Sounds, Studio, Synagoge, Theaters Tilburg, V39, Virginarty, Weemoed, Willemsplein, Zaal 16.

Notes

External links
 

Rock festivals in the Netherlands
Music festivals in the Netherlands
Cultural festivals in the Netherlands
Music festivals established in 2005
2005 establishments in the Netherlands
Culture in Tilburg
Music in Tilburg
Events in Tilburg